The Manges 'R' Good Enough is the debut album recorded by The Manges and was released on October 6, 2001 by Stardumb Records. It was recorded in a studio in New York City with Tony of the Kowalskis. This album includes guest appearances by Joe Queer of The Queers, Kitty Kowalski and Mike 'Vacant Lot'.

Track listing 

I'm a Monkey
Blame Game
Elvis Has Left the Building
I'll Take You to Hawaii
I Hate Rats
80s Soldier
Kids Are at the Mall
Miss Evil
Now or Never
The Goonies 'R' Good Enough
Rumble in Chinatown
Yeah (Late Nite Song)

Credits 

Vocals, Guitar – Andrea Caredda
Bass – Massimo Zannoni
Drums – Manuel Cossu
Lead Guitar [Additional] – Mike "Vacant Lot" Hoffman
Lead Guitar, Rhythm Guitar – Steve Boltz 
Mastered By – Tony 'Guru' Kowalski
Producer – Tony 'Guru' Kowalski
Recorded and Mixed By – Forrest Hart, Tony 'Guru' Kowalski

References 

2001 debut albums